A Feast of Consequences is an album by Fish. It is his tenth solo studio album since he left Marillion in 1988 and the first since 13th Star (2007). It was released on Fish's own imprint Chocolate Frog Record Company.

Track listing 

All songs written by Dick/Vantsis/Boult, except where noted.

CD edition

Vinyl edition 

 Side Four Live tracks recorded at Karlsruhe Substage 25 October 2013.

Personnel
Fish (Derek W. Dick) – vocals, lyrics
Robin Boult – guitars
Steve Vantsis – bass guitar
Foss Paterson – keyboards
Gavin Griffiths – drums
Elisabeth Troy Antwi – backing vocals

References

2013 albums
Fish (singer) albums